Amerasinghe Mudalige Jayantha Gamini Amerasinghe (born February 2, 1954, Colombo) is a former Sri Lankan cricketer who played in two Tests in 1984.

International career
Amerasinghe is the only Sri Lankan to top-score for his team in a Test as a number 11 batsman, when he scored 34 where Sri Lanka were dismissed for 215 in their first innings by New Zealand in 1984.

Also he was only the second player from any team to top-score for his team in the second innings of a Test as a number 11 batsman, after Bert Vogler of South Africa. Amerasinghe was just the fifth player in Test history to top-score for his team in a Test as a number 11 batsman.

References

1954 births
Living people
Sri Lanka Test cricketers
Sri Lankan cricketers
Alumni of Royal College, Colombo
Nomads Sports Club cricketers
Antonians Sports Club cricketers